The twelve-sided Australian fifty-cent coin is the third-highest denomination coin of the Australian dollar and the largest in terms of size in circulation. It is equal in size and shape to the Cook Island $5 coin, and both remain the only 12-sided coins in the southern hemisphere. It was introduced in 1969 to replace the round fifty-cent coin issued in 1966.

The original, round, 50-cent coin was made of 80% silver and 20% copper; but as the value of a free-floating silver price became higher, the coin's bullion value became more valuable than its face value; so that version was withdrawn from circulation and replaced with the dodecagonal cupro-nickel version.

It is by diameter the largest Australian coin currently issued and second largest after the Crown of 1937–38. It is also the heaviest Australian coin in common circulation.  Many commemorative designs have been issued, the large size allowing for detailed content.

Coins of larger diameter include the Costa Rican five-hundred-colón and the fifty-franc (CFP), both .

The 1986, 1987, 1989, 1990, 1992, year dated 50¢ are only available in mint and proof sets, with the exception of the 1967 and 1968, as no mint/proof sets exist for those years and there were no circulation strikes produced either.

Fifty-cent coins are legal tender for amounts not exceeding $5 for any payment of a debt.

Obverse
As with all coins of Australia, the reigning monarch features on the obverse. Only Elizabeth II has been featured on the coin so far.

Unlike other decimal denominations, five different portraits of the queen have been used on 50-cent coins. A unique effigy by Vladimir Gottwald was used for the 2000 royal visit commemorative fifty-cent piece. This is the only Australian decimal coin to have an obverse designed by an Australian and to have a portrait of the queen which is not also used on British currency.

The other four portraits have featured on all then-current denominations: from 1966 to 1984 one by Arnold Machin, from 1985 to 1998 one by Raphael Maklouf, from 1999 to 2019 a portrait by Ian Rank-Broadley, and since 2019 a portrait by Jody Clark. These portraits were introduced to British coins in 1968, 1985, 1998 and 2015, respectively.

Commemorative coins

The Australian fifty-cent coin was the first to display a variation of the reverse design in 1970 for the commemorating the bicentennial of Lieutenant James Cook's landing in Australia. Various other designs followed until the one-dollar and twenty-cent coins also included new designs.

See also

 Coins of the Australian dollar

References

External links
Fifty Cents | Royal Australian Mint
Fifty Cents, Coin Type from Australia - Online Coin Club

Decimal coins of Australia
Fifty-cent coins
Currencies introduced in 1969